Marcel Queheille (16 March 1930 – 17 July 2021) was a French professional road bicycle racer. He was born in Sanguis. In 1959 Queheille was the winner of the ninth stage of the 1959 Tour de France.

Major results

1956
Cazès-Mondenard
Tarbes
1957
Felletin
Grand-Bourg
1958
Bessereix
Villefranche-en-Rouerge
1959
Guéret
Tour de France:
Winner stage 9
1961
Mende
1962
Saint-Jean

References

External links 
Official Tour de France results for Marcel Queheille

French male cyclists
1930 births
2021 deaths
French Tour de France stage winners
Sportspeople from Pyrénées-Atlantiques
Cyclists from Nouvelle-Aquitaine
20th-century French people